No. 517 Squadron RAF was a meteorological squadron of the Royal Air Force during the Second World War.

History
No. 517 Squadron was formed on 11 August 1943 at RAF St Eval, Cornwall, when No. 1404 (Meteorological) Flight RAF was re-numbered. It was equipped with Lockheed Hudsons and Handley Page Hampdens, which it flew daily out into the Atlantic to collect meteorological data. Between September and November 1943 four United States Army Air Forces Flying Fortresses were temporarily attached to the squadron, awaiting the arrival of adapted Handley Page Halifaxes.
By November 1943 the squadron had re-equipped with the Halifax and then moved to RAF St David's in Wales. Two further moves followed, one to RAF Brawdy in February 1944 and then after the war to RAF Chivenor where the squadron was disbanded on 21 June 1946.

Aircraft operated

Squadron bases

See also
List of Royal Air Force aircraft squadrons

References

Notes

Bibliography

External links

 History of No.'s 500–520 Squadrons at RAF Web
 History of No. 517 Squadron on raf.mod.uk

517
Aircraft squadrons of the Royal Air Force in World War II
Military units and formations established in 1943